Wayne Roberts (October 20, 1950 – June 11, 2012), known as Stay High 149, was an American graffiti artist.

Career
Roberts was born in Emporia, Virginia, moving to the Bronx, New York at age six. He was called a "superstar" of the graffiti world in the late 1970s. Widely considered to use one of the most famous graffiti tags in the world, his trademark includes a smoking version of the stick figure from 1960s British television program The Saint.

Roberts collaborated with a number of well known brands during his career, including Huf, and the Burton Snowboards skate brand, Gravis.

Roberts was featured in the 2004 documentary Just to Get a Rep by Peter Gerard.

Death
Roberts died on June 11, 2012 from a liver disease at Calvary Hospital in The Bronx, New York.

References

External links
 Official Website
 149st Biography

American graffiti artists
1950 births
2012 deaths
People from Emporia, Virginia
People from the Bronx
Artists from Virginia
Artists from the Bronx
Deaths from liver disease